Seasons is an album by David Murray, released on the Pow Wow label. It was released in 1999 and contains performances by Murray and a veteran quartet of pianist Roland Hanna, bassist Richard Davis and drummer Victor Lewis.

Reception
The AllMusic review by Scott Yanow stated: "Among the better numbers on this restrained date are 'Spring Will Be a Little Late This Year,' 'The Summer Knows,' 'Autumn in New York,' and 'Snowfall.'"

Track listing
 "Seasons" (Hanna) – 8:28  
 "Spring Will Be a Little Late This Year" (Loesser) – 5:38  
 "Spring Is Here" (Hart, Rodgers) – 7:58  
 "The Summer Knows" (Bergman, Bergman, Legrand) – 8:55  
 "Indian Summer" (Dubin, Herbert) – 4:51  
 "September Song" (Anderson, Weill) – 8:31  
 "Autumn in New York" (Strouse) – 6:34  
 "September in the Rain" (Dubin, Warren) – 6:49  
 "Snowfall" (Thornhill, Ruth Thornhill) – 7:18  
 "Let It Snow! Let It Snow! Let It Snow!" (Cahn, Styne) – 6:02  
Recorded August 3, 1998

Personnel
David Murray – tenor saxophone, bass clarinet
Roland Hanna – piano
Richard Davis – bass
Victor Lewis – drums

References 

1999 albums
David Murray (saxophonist) albums